This page lists significant events of 2023 in archaeology.

Excavations

Finds 

January
 5 – A study reports that notational signs from ~37,000 years ago in caves, apparently conveying calendaric meaning about the behaviour of animal species drawn next to them, are the first known (proto-)writing in history.
 17 – 4,500 year-old Sumerian Lord Palace of the Kings was discovered in Iraq, Girsu.
 27 – 1,600-year-old fragment of Roman dodecahedron unearthed in Belgium, Flanders.
February

 20 – A study reports that 2,000 year-old disembodied 6.3 inches long wooden phallus toy was revealed at the Roman Fort of Vindolanda by the Newcastle University.

 21 – A 2,000-year-old stringed musical instrument about 35 centimeters long was discovered at the Go Ô Chùa archaeological site in Long An province, southern Vietnam.
 22 – The remains of two elite brothers were found in a Bronze Age tomb in Tel Megiddo, Israel. The early evidence of a Bronze Age cranial surgery called trepanation was also identified in one of the males.
 26 – 16 individual tombs and 6 funerary complex from the Persian, Roman and Coptic periods were discovered by the Egyptian-Spanish archaeological mission at the Al-Bahnasa archaeological site, Minya, Egypt.
 28 – A study reports that steel chisels were already in use in Europe on the Iberian peninsula around 2,900 years ago.
March

 1 – Ancient Egyptian hieroglyphs inscribed on sandstone blocks was discovered in Old Dongola, Sudan by Polish archaeologists.
 4 – A submerged prehistoric site with the remains of extinct species was discovered in the Quintero Bay on the central Chilean coast.
 4 – A treasure hoard weighing 3 kg was uncovered in a ceramic jar in Lublin Voivodeship, Poland.
 6 – A Roman era sphinx was revealed at the lower level of the Dendera Temple complex in Qena, Egypt.
 7 – A 1,800 year-old Roman era stone altar was discovered in the grounds of Leicester Cathedral by the University of Leicester, England.
 9 – Evidence of the Romano-Celtic religious temple was discovered near the Lancaster Fort during a hydrogeophysics training session in Lancaster, England.
 9 – A cemetery dated to the Tang Dynasty with over 300 artifacts was unearthed in Datong, China.
 9 – Pre-Columbian temple complex made of dried bricks with destroyed human burials was discovered near Barranca, Peru.

Events 
January

 16 – Poznań Young Researchers' Archeology Conference was held in Poland in Biskupin Archaeological Museum. 
February

 9 – the Temple of Hatshepsut and the Tomb of Meru were opened to the public after the restoration.
 27  – The Archaeological Museum of Elefsina has reopened to the public following the conclusion of restoration works.

Deaths

See also

 List of years in archaeology

References 

Archaeology by year
2023-related lists
2023 in science

2023
Science timelines by year